Lorraine Lois Foster (December 25, 1938, Culver City, California) is an American mathematician. In 1964 she became the first woman to receive a Ph.D. in mathematics from  California Institute of Technology. Her thesis advisor at Caltech was Olga Taussky-Todd. Foster's Erdos number is 2.

Born Lorraine Lois Turnbull, she attended Occidental College where she majored in physics. She was admitted to Caltech after receiving a Woodrow Wilson Foundation fellowship. In 1964 she joined the faculty of California State University, Northridge. She works in number theory and the theory of mathematical symmetry.

Selected bibliography
Foster, L. (1966). On the characteristic roots of the product of certain rational integral matrices of order two. Pacific Journal of Mathematics, 18(1), 97–110. http://doi.org/10.2140/pjm.1966.18.97
Brenner, J. L., & Foster, L. L. (1982). Exponential diophantine equations. Pacific Journal of Mathematics, 101(2), 263–301.
Alex, L. J., & Foster, L. L. (1983). On diophantine equations of the form . Rocky Mountain Journal of Mathematics, 13(2), 321–332. http://doi.org/10.1216/RMJ-1983-13-2-321
Alex, L. J., & Foster, L. L. (1985). On the Diophantine equation . Rocky Mountain Journal of Mathematics, 15(3), 739–762. http://doi.org/10.1216/RMJ-1985-15-3-739
 L. Foster (1989). Finite Symmetry Groups in Three Dimensions, CSUN Instructional Media Center, Jan. 1989 (video, 27 minutes).
 L. Foster (1990). Archimedean and Archimedean Dual Polyhedra, CSUN Instructional Media Center, Feb. 1990 (video, 47 minutes). https://www.worldcat.org/title/archimedean-and-archimedean-dual-polyhedra/oclc/63936926&referer=brief_results
Foster, L. L. (1990). On the symmetry group of the dodecahedron. Mathematics Magazine, 63, 106–107.
 Foster, L. L. (1991). Convex Polyhedral Models for the Finite Three-Dimensional Isometry Groups. The Mathematical Heritage of CF Gauss, pp 267–281.
 L. Foster (1991). The Alhambra Past and Present—a Geometer’s Odyssey Part 1, CSUN Instructional Media Center, December 1991 (video, 40 minutes).
 L. Foster (1991). The Alhambra Past and Present—a Geometer’s Odyssey Part 2, CSUN Instructional Media Center, December 1991 (video, 40 minutes). https://www.worldcat.org/title/alhambra-past-and-present-a-geometers-odyssey-parts-1-and-2/oclc/28680624?loc=94043&tab=holdings&start_holding=7
 Foster, L. L. (1991). Convex polyhedral models for the finite three-dimensional isometry groups. In G. M. Rassias (Ed.), The Mathematical Heritage of C F Gauss (pp. 267–281). Singapore: World Scientific.
 L. Foster (1992). Regular-Faced Polyhedra—an Introduction, CSUN Instructional Media Center, Dec. 1992 (video, 47 minutes)
Alex, L. J., & Foster, L. L. (1992). On the Diophantine equation . Rocky Mountain Journal of Mathematics, 22(1), 11–62. http://doi.org/10.1216/rmjm/1181072793
Alex, L. J., & Foster, L. L. (1995). Rev. Mat. Univ. Complut. Madrid, 8(1), 13–48.

References

20th-century American mathematicians
21st-century American mathematicians
Living people
Number theorists
Occidental College alumni
California Institute of Technology alumni
California State University, Northridge faculty
1938 births